Marek Franciszek Dopierała (born 30 July 1960 in Bielsko-Biała) is a Polish sprint canoeist who competed during the 1980s. Competing in two Summer Olympics, he won two medals with Marek Łbik at Seoul in 1988 with a silver in the C-2 500 m event and a bronze in the C-2 1000 m event.

Dopierała also won six medals at the ICF Canoe Sprint World Championships with two golds (C-2 500 m: 1987, C-2 10000 m: 1986), three silvers (C-2 500 m: 1985, C-2 1000 m: 1986, 1987), and one bronze (C-2 1000 m: 1985).

References

External links
 
 

1960 births
Canoeists at the 1980 Summer Olympics
Canoeists at the 1988 Summer Olympics
Living people
Olympic canoeists of Poland
Olympic silver medalists for Poland
Olympic bronze medalists for Poland
Polish male canoeists
Olympic medalists in canoeing
Sportspeople from Bielsko-Biała
ICF Canoe Sprint World Championships medalists in Canadian
Medalists at the 1988 Summer Olympics
20th-century Polish people